Natalya Ilinichna Ionova (born 7 June 1986), better known by her stage name Glukoza (glucose), is a Russian singer.

Biography
Ionova was born in Syzran, Kuybyshevskaya Oblast, Russian SFSR, Soviet Union. 

As a child, her hobbies included ballet and chess.  She also did some acting and was in the films Triumph and War of the Princesses, as well as a few episodes of Yeralash. Currently she has a passion for aviation, her two Dobermans, and her yellow Mini Cooper, which she enjoys driving. She describes her favorite musical artists as Madonna, Moby, Mumiy Troll and Agatha Kristi.

Music career

In December 2005 she recorded and released an English version of her popular song "Schweine" that never took off with the public. In late June 2006 Glukoza married Alexander Chistyakov, manager of the power supply systems of Russia. 

After her pregnancy leave, she released another single called "Dengi" (Money). During the festival, "New Wave" she sang a duet with Maxim Fadeev "Sicily". In May 2010 she released new single "Vot Takaya Lubov'", video.

In 2011, Glukoza competed on the Russian version of the television show Fort Boyard.

Personal life 
She married Aleksandr Chistyakov (born 23 January 1973) on 17 June 2006. The couple has two daughters: Lidia Chistyakova (born 10 May 2007) and Vera Chistyakova (born 8 September 2011). Both girls were born in Spain. She currently lives in Moscow, Russia with her family.

In August 2020 Glukoza was banned from entering Ukraine for three years because of a violation Ukrainian law "by visiting the Crimean peninsula occupied by her country,". Crimea is currently under dispute by Russia and Ukraine.

Discography 

2003: Glukoza Nostra

Tracklist:
A1	Глюк’oza Nostra	
A2	Аста Ла Виста	
A3	Невеста	
A4	Ненавижу	
A5	Малыш	
B1	Ля Мур	
B2	Моя Любовь	
B3	Шуга	
B4	Вокзал	
B5	Снег	
2005: Moskva

Track listing
"Швайне" (English: from german language "Pigs") – 4:25
"Снег Идёт" (English: It's Snowing) – 3:58
"Горилла" (English: Gorilla) – 5:01
"К Чёрту" (English: To Hell) – 5:14
"Юра" (English: Yura) – 3:26
"Москва" (English: Moscow) – 5:46
"Пипец" (English: Shit) – 3:08
"Корабли" (English: Ships) – 3:48
"Ой-Ой" (English: Oh-Oh) – 3:39
"Карина" (English: Karina) – 3:36
"Москва" (version 2)
"Юра" (version 2)
"Швайне" (version 2)
2011: Trans-FORMA

Тракинг

01. Vzmah
02. Hochu muzhchinu (Suka GAGA)
03. Vot takaya lyubov
04. Naigralis
05. Moy porok
06. Sledy slyoz
07. Frik
08. Tantsuy, Rossiya!!!
09. Babochki
10. Vystrel v spinu
11. Dochka
12. Kak v detstve
13. Sugar (Live)
14. High Sign
15. Schweine (Live)
16. Forget you not

References

External links 
 Glukoza's Official Site   
 Glukoza's lyrics and English translations
 

1986 births
Living people
People from Syzran
21st-century Russian singers
Russian pop singers
Russian pop musicians
Russian television presenters
Russian film actresses
Russian voice actresses
Russian television actresses
21st-century Russian women singers
Russian women television presenters
MTV Europe Music Award winners
Winners of the Golden Gramophone Award